Feodor Starčević (born 30 June 1942) is a Serbian diplomat and United Nations official.

Starčević was born in Split, Croatia. Beginning in the late 1960s, Starčević worked as a diplomat for Yugoslavia, including time at the Yugoslav embassy in the United Kingdom and at the United Nations in New York. From 1992 to 1995, Starčević was United Nations Chief Representative in Tbilisi, Georgia and from 1995 and 2004 he was Director of the United Nations Information Centre for India and Bhutan  in New Delhi.

In May 2009, Starčević became the Permanent Representative of Serbia to the United Nations in New York.

He graduated from the University of Belgrade's Law School, having also attended the School of Journalism of the Vjesnik daily newspaper in Zagreb. Starčević speaks English and French.

References
"New Permanent Representative of Serbia Presents Credentials", UN Press Release, UN Doc. BIO/4087, 2009-06-03
"Feodor Starčević is Back", UN Forum Insider, 2009-07-15

1942 births
Diplomats from Split, Croatia
Living people
Croatian expatriates in Serbia
Permanent Representatives of Serbia to the United Nations
Serbian officials of the United Nations
University of Belgrade Faculty of Law alumni
Ambassadors of Serbia to Benin
Ambassadors of Serbia to Burkina Faso
Ambassadors of Serbia to Cape Verde
Ambassadors of Serbia to the Central African Republic
Ambassadors of Serbia to the Comoros
Ambassadors of Serbia to Equatorial Guinea
Ambassadors of Serbia to Eritrea
Ambassadors of Serbia to Ivory Coast
Ambassadors of Serbia to Liberia
Ambassadors of Serbia to Madagascar
Ambassadors of Serbia to Mauritania
Ambassadors of Serbia to Mauritius
Ambassadors of Serbia to Niger
Ambassadors of Serbia to São Tomé and Príncipe
Ambassadors of Serbia to Sierra Leone
Ambassadors of Serbia to Somalia
Ambassadors of Serbia to Togo
Yugoslav officials of the United Nations
Serbia and Montenegro officials of the United Nations